Fairview is an unincorporated community in Lincoln County, in the U.S. state of Missouri.

History
A post office called Fairview was established in 1882, and remained in operation until 1903. The name Fairview is commendatory.

References

Unincorporated communities in Lincoln County, Missouri
Unincorporated communities in Missouri